Gheorghe Ștefan, also known as Pinalti (born April 23, 1953), is a Romanian politician who served as mayor of Piatra Neamț from 2004 to 2014. He was owner of FC Ceahlăul Piatra Neamț. He was a member of the Democratic Liberal Party.

Microsoft licensing scandal
In the Microsoft licensing corruption scandal, Gheorghe Ștefan was sentenced on 24 March 2016 to 3 years imprisonment for influence peddling and to an asset forfeiture of €3 million. On 3 October 2016, the High Court of Cassation and Justice rendered the final judgment in the case and sentenced him to 6 years imprisonment and to an asset forfeiture of €3,996,360.

See also
 Microsoft licensing corruption scandal
 List of corruption scandals in Romania

References

Living people
1953 births
Mayors of places in Romania
Democratic Liberal Party (Romania) politicians
Romanian politicians convicted of corruption
People from Piatra Neamț